Rock or Bust World Tour was a 2015–2016 concert tour by Australian rock band AC/DC, in support of their sixteenth studio album Rock or Bust, which was released on 28 November 2014. This tour had 7 legs around the world lasting more than 17 months starting on 10 April 2015 in Indio, California and finishing on 20 September 2016 in Philadelphia, Pennsylvania.

Background
Malcolm Young was replaced by his and Angus' nephew Stevie Young and Phil Rudd was replaced by their former drummer Chris Slade. They have both played for AC/DC on the Blow Up Your Video World Tour and on the Razors Edge World Tour, respectively.

In Germany, the band set a new world record in the number of sold tickets within the shortest timespan, with more than 300,000 tickets sold out in seventy-seven minutes.

In Switzerland, the band set a new record in the duration to a 'sold out' concert. The concert in Zurich was sold out in 6 minutes (over 40,000 tickets)

The band played at the 57th Annual Grammy Awards, performing "Rock or Bust" and "Highway to Hell" on 8 February 2015.

The last 22 shows were rescheduled as Brian Johnson was ordered to stop touring immediately. Ten shows from 8 March 2016 to 4 April 2016 were cancelled and had to be rescheduled, with Axl Rose of Guns N' Roses appearing in Johnson's place marking first time that AC/DC has featured a lead vocalist other than Brian Johnson since they concluded the Highway to Hell Tour on 27 January 1980.

As part of this tour, AC/DC performed the first concert at the Olympic Stadium in London since its redevelopment following the 2012 Olympic and Paralympic Games.

Longtime bassist Cliff Williams announced that he would retire upon completion of the tour, citing losing interest following the health issues with Malcolm Young and Brian Johnson, and the legal issues with Phil Rudd.

The band broke their normal routine at the end of the final concert with Angus Young leading Williams out to the front of the stage to take a final bow. Rose also introduced the band members one by one. On 30 September 2020, AC/DC officially confirmed that Johnson, Rudd, and Williams had rejoined the band with plans for a new studio album and possibly tour, signaling that this tour may not be the last tour with Johnson and Williams, as the next tour would include Johnson and Williams, along with Phil Rudd who was unable to participate in the tour due to legal issues, and guitarists Angus and Stevie Young; reuniting the surviving "Back in Black" lineup members.

The tour was the second highest grossing tour of 2015, which grossed $250.4 million, while AC/DC’s tour grossed $180 million, which the band amassed despite an average ticket price of just $78.

Grossing
The Rock or Bust World Tour was the second most attended tour of 2015 behind One Direction and third highest-grossing tour behind Taylor Swift and One Direction (Pollstar Year End Top 100 Worldwide tours of 2015).
The tour grossed $180 million from 54 shows in 2015. and $40.1 million from 32 shows in 2016. There was a total gross of $221.1 million from 86 shows performed. 2.31 million fans attended the tour's 2015 dates and the band played to an estimated 4 million fans worldwide for the entire tour.

Setlist

 "Rock or Bust"
 "Shoot to Thrill"
 "Hell Ain't a Bad Place to Be"
 "Back in Black"
 "Play Ball"[a]
 "Got Some Rock & Roll Thunder"[b]
 "Dirty Deeds Done Dirt Cheap"
 "Rock 'n' Roll Damnation"[b]
 "Thunderstruck"
 "High Voltage"
 "Rock 'n' Roll Train"
 "Hells Bells"
 "Baptism by Fire"[a]
 "Givin' the Dog a Bone"[b]
 "Dog Eat Dog"[b]
 "If You Want Blood (You've Got It)"[b]
 "Touch Too Much"[b]
 "Live Wire"[b]
 "Sin City"
 "You Shook Me All Night Long"
 "Shot Down in Flames"
 "Have a Drink on Me"
 "T.N.T."
 "Whole Lotta Rosie"
 "Let There Be Rock" 

Encore
 "Highway to Hell"
"Riff Raff"[b]
"Problem Child"[b]
"For Those About to Rock (We Salute You)"

Notes

Tour dates

Postponed dates

Personnel
Angus Young – lead guitar
Cliff Williams – bass guitar, backing vocals
Stevie Young – rhythm guitar, backing vocals
Chris Slade – drums
Brian Johnson – lead vocals (legs 1–5)

Additional musicians
Axl Rose – lead vocals (legs 6–7)

Notes

References

AC/DC concert tours
2015 concert tours
2016 concert tours
Axl Rose